This is a list of roads designated N8. The entries are sorted in alphabetical order by country name.

 N8 (Bangladesh)
 N8 road (Belgium), a road connecting Brussels and Koksijde
 N8 road (France)
 N8 road (Ireland)
 N8 road (Luxembourg)
 N8 road (Netherlands)
 N8 road (South Africa), a road connecting Upington, Kimberley, Bloemfontein and the Lesotho border
 N8 road (Switzerland)
 Nebraska Highway 8, a state highway in the U.S. state of Nebraska